Wanyin was a Shan state in what is today Burma. It belonged to the Central Division of the Southern Shan States.

References

External links
"Gazetteer of Upper Burma and the Shan states"
The Imperial Gazetteer of India

Shan States